Oo is a populated place in the Central Sulawesi province of Indonesia.

References

Populated places in Central Sulawesi